Intermediate Certificate or intermediate certificate may refer to:
 Intermediate Certificate (Australia) school examination abolished in the 1960s
 Intermediate Certificate (Ireland) school examination replaced in 1992 by the Junior Certificate
 Intermediate certificate (cryptography), in public key cryptography, a certificate authority (CA) certificate other than a root CA certificate